Barytherium (meaning "heavy beast") is a genus of an extinct family (Barytheriidae) of primitive proboscideans that lived during the late Eocene and early Oligocene in North Africa. The type species is Barytherium grave, found at the beginning of the 20th century in Fayum, Egypt. Since then, more complete specimens have been found at Dor el Talha, Libya. More fossils were also discovered in 2011 in the Aidum area in Dhofar by Oman's Ministry of Heritage and Culture, which was named Barytherium omansi.

Description 

The barytheriids were the first large proboscideans to appear in the fossil records. Barytherium itself stood about 1.8–2.0 m tall at the shoulder and weighed around 2 tonnes. Barytherium spp. had eight very short tusks, four each in the upper and lower jaws, which resembled those of a modern hippopotamus more than those of an elephant. The upper pairs were vertical, while the lower pairs projected forwards from the mouth horizontally. Together, these would have created a shearing action for cropping plants.

There is disagreement about the nose of Barytherium. While it is now considered that moeritheriids did not posseess a proboscis, Barytherium are often restored with one resembling that of a tapir or elephant seal. Some palaeontologists have argued the arrangement of the teeth indicate Barytherium had a fairly long trunk similar to modern elephants.

References 

Eocene proboscideans
Oligocene proboscideans
Eocene genus first appearances
Rupelian genus extinctions
Prehistoric placental genera
Eocene mammals of Africa
Oligocene mammals of Africa
Taxa named by Charles William Andrews
Fossil taxa described in 1901